Cupressus gigantea, the Tibetan cypress, is a species of conifer in the family Cupressaceae in Asia. C. gigantea was previously classified as a subspecies of Cupressus torulosa because of their similar morphological characteristics and close distribution, but have since been genetically distinguished as separate species.

Distribution
It is endemic to Southeast Tibet - China on the Qinghai-Tibetan plateau, particularly in the dry valleys of Nyang River and Yarlung Tsangpo River. Cupressus gigantea is the biggest of all Cupressus species.

King cypress
The biggest known specimen is the famous King Cypress, about 50 meters high, 5.8 meters in diameter,  of crown-projection-area; and calculated age of 2,600 years.

References

gigantea
Endemic flora of Tibet
Trees of China
Vulnerable flora of Asia
Plants described in 1975
Taxonomy articles created by Polbot